The Pentax Optio H90 is a digital compact camera announced by Pentax on January 25, 2010. It was launched under a new "functional beauty" design paradigm and was described as exhibiting "pleasant minimalism". It is compatible with Eye-Fi wireless SD cards and supports 720p video.

References

http://www.dpreview.com/products/pentax/compacts/pentax_optioh90/specifications

Pentax cameras
Cameras introduced in 2010